The South Australia Women cricket team, also known as the Statewide Super South Australian Scorpions, is the women's representative cricket team for the Australian State of South Australia. They play their home games at Karen Rolton Oval, Adelaide. They compete in the Women's National Cricket League (WNCL), the premier 50-over women's cricket tournament in Australia. They previously played in the now-defunct Australian Women's Twenty20 Cup and Australian Women's Cricket Championships.

History

1935–1996: Australian Women's Cricket Championships
South Australia's first recorded match was against Victoria in the Australian Women's Cricket Championships on 10 to 11 January 1935, which they lost by an innings and 184 runs. They continued to regularly play in the Championships until its final season in 1995–96. They won the title five times, making them the third most successful team after Victoria and New South Wales.

1996–present: Women's National Cricket League and Twenty20 Cup
South Australia joined the newly-established WNCL in 1996–97. They have won one title, in 2015–16. Their best finish in the Australian Women's Twenty20 Cup was third in 2010–11.

Grounds
South Australia have used a number of grounds over the years. Their first recorded home match against Western Australia in 1936 was played at Hindmarsh Oval, Adelaide. Historically they have played the vast majority of their home matches at various grounds in Adelaide.

After the inception of the WNCL in 1996, South Australia began playing regular matches at the Adelaide Oval and its adjacent ground, Adelaide Oval No 2, as well as various other grounds in Adelaide such as Park 25 and University Oval. Outside Adelaide, they played two matches in the 2006–07 WNCL at Centennial Park in Nuriootpa.

In the 2019–20 WNCL, South Australia played all of their home games at the Karen Rolton Oval, a newly upgraded ground located at Park 25 in Adelaide. They also played their three 2020–21 WNCL home games, their two 2021–22 WNCL home games and their six 2022–23 WNCL home games at the Karen Rolton Oval.

Players

Current squad
Based on squad announced for the 2022/23 season. Players in bold have international caps.

Notable players
Players who have played for South Australia and played internationally are listed below, in order of first international appearance (given in brackets):

 Dot Laughton (1949)
 Ruth Dow (1957)
 Barbara Orchard (1957)
 Faith Thomas (1958)
 Margaret Jude (1963)
 Jill Need (1968)
 Wendy Blunsden (1972)
 Betty McDonald (1973)
 Janette Tredrea (1976)
 Jan Lumsden (1976)
 Kerry Mortimer (1976)
 Jill Kennare (1979)
 Jen Jacobs (1979)
 Lyn Fullston (1982)
 Lynley Hamilton (1982)
 Rhonda Kendall (1982)
 Annette Fellows (1984)
 Wendy Piltz (1984)
 Lee-Anne Hunter (1985)
 Andrea McCauley (1990)
 Joanne Broadbent (1990)
 Tunde Juhasz (1991)
 Isabelle Tsakiris (1992)
 Caroline Ward (1994)
 Olivia Magno (1995)
 Karen Rolton (1995)
 Charlotte Edwards (1996)
 Beth Morgan (1999)
 Leanne Davis (2000)
 Caroline Atkins (2001)
 Kate Oakenfold (2001)
 Kris Britt (2003)
 Jenny Gunn (2004)
 Shelley Nitschke (2004)
 Suzie Bates (2006)
 Sarah Taylor (2006)
 Sophie Devine (2006)
 Emma Sampson (2007)
 Lucy Doolan (2008)
 Lauren Ebsary (2008)
 Sarah Coyte (2010)
 Megan Schutt (2012)
 Tahlia McGrath (2016)
 Amanda-Jade Wellington (2016)
 Ashleigh Gardner (2017)
 Alicia Dean (2019)
 Darcie Brown (2021)

Coaching staff
 Head coach: Luke Williams
 Assistant coach: Jude Coleman

Honours
Australian Women's Cricket Championships:
Winners (5): 1951–52, 1979–80, 1991–92, 1992–93, 1994–95
Women's National Cricket League:
Winners (1): 2015–16
Australian Women's Twenty20 Cup:
Winners (0):
Best finish: 3rd (2010–11)

See also

South Australian Cricket Association
South Australia men's cricket team
Adelaide Strikers (WBBL)

References

 
Australian women's cricket teams
Cricket in South Australia
Sco
Sporting clubs in Adelaide